Tingwick is a Canadian municipality of Quebec established in Arthabaska Regional County Municipality, Quebec.

Geography
The Municipality of Tingwick is located within the township of Tingwick in the Eastern Townships. There are 2 rivers: Rivière des Pins and Rivière des Rosiers (also known as Trout River).

Sport
A skiing centre is located at Mount Gleason.

Economy
Agriculture is the main industry in the area, focusing on dairy, pork, and maple sugar production.

Building
Catholic church Saint Patrick since 1857.
Primary school Saint-Coeur-de-Marie.

Event
Festival "Rodeo Mecanique" in August.

References

Municipalities in Quebec
Incorporated places in Centre-du-Québec
1981 establishments in Quebec